Weston on Trent railway station served the village of Weston-on-Trent, Derbyshire from 1869 to 1930.

History
The station was opened on 6 December 1869, when the Midland Railway opened its Weston, Castle Donington and Trent branch.

It was closed to passengers on 21 September 1930 then closed to freight in 1959.

Services

References

Railway stations in Great Britain opened in 1869
Railway stations in Great Britain closed in 1930
Disused railway stations in Derbyshire